Alfred Hope Patten (17 November 1885 in the Town Brewery, Sidmouth – 11 August 1958 in the College, Little Walsingham), known as "Pat" to his friends, was an Anglo-Catholic priest in the Church of England, best known for his restoration of the Anglican Shrine of Our Lady of Walsingham.

Life 
An introspective only child, he became an Anglo-Catholic in Brighton whilst still a teenager. He became interested in not only the medieval church but also the religious life, visiting the Anglican Benedictines at Painsthorpe in 1906 and being profoundly influenced by their abbot, Aelred Carlyle.

After attending Lichfield Theological College he was ordained deacon in 1913 at Holy Cross, Cromer Street in the St Pancras area of London. After three other curacies, including the Good Shepherd church, Carshalton, in 1921 he became Vicar of Great and Little Walsingham with St Giles', Houghton. Within months of arriving, he had a statue of Our Lady of Walsingham modelled on the medieval priory's seal and placed it in the parish's main church, St Mary's. He also started Marian devotions in his church and - aided by the League of Our Lady (later the Society of Mary) - the first pilgrimages from London. His bishop in Norwich, Bertram Pollock, opposed the statue and Patten agreed to move it out of the church, using this as a chance to rebuild the Holy House in 1931. The Holy House was rebuilt in 1938 to accommodate rising pilgrim numbers and became the Anglican Shrine of Our Lady of Walsingham. In 1930, Patten led a pilgrimage to the Shrine of Our Lady of Egmanton. On his death he was buried in the churchyard of St Mary's in Walsingham.

Works
Pilgrims' Manual (1928)
England's National Shrine of Our Lady Past and Present with Enid Chadwick (1939)
Mary's Shrine of the Holy House, Walsingham (1954)  
Our Lady's Mirror, a quarterly paper set up in 1926 by Hope for the members of the Society of Our Lady of Walsingham

References

External links

1885 births
1958 deaths
People from Sidmouth
English Anglo-Catholics
Alumni of Lichfield Theological College
Anglo-Catholic clergy
People from Brighton
People from Walsingham